

This is a list of properties and districts on the Hawaiian island of Oahu that are listed on the National Register of Historic Places. Oahu is the only major island in Honolulu County. The location of the city of Honolulu, Oahu is the most populous island in the state. There are 168 properties and districts on the island, including 16 National Historic Landmarks. Three formerly listed sites were demolished and have been removed from the Register.

Current listings

|}

Former listings

|}

See also
List of National Historic Landmarks in Hawaii
National Register of Historic Places listings in Hawaii

References

External links

 Historic Hawaii Foundation
 Aviation: From sand dunes to sonic booms – (Hawaii) National Register

Oahu
Honolulu County, Hawaii
Oahu